Doyle Overton Hickey (July 27, 1892 – October 20, 1961) was an officer in the United States Army who served in World War I, World War II and the Korean War, finishing his military career as a lieutenant general.

Early life
Hickey was born in Rector, Arkansas on July 27, 1892, the son of John B. and Genie (Crews) Hickey.  Hickey was educated in Camden, and graduated from Camden High School in 1909.  He was a 1903 graduate of Hendrix College, after which studied law with a local attorney.  Hickey worked at a Memphis, Tennessee lumber company until deciding to enlist for World War I.

World War I
He joined the Army, attended Officer Candidate School at Leon Springs, Texas, and in 1917 was commissioned as a second lieutenant in the Artillery.  Hickey was assigned to the 31st Infantry Division and served in France until the end of the war.

Post-World War I
After the war, Hickey continued his Army career, attending the Field Artillery School at Fort Sill, Oklahoma and graduating from the Command and General Staff College at Fort Leavenworth, Kansas in 1936.  In the early 1930s, he served with the 7th Field Artillery Regiment at Madison Barracks, New York, afterwards being assigned to duty as Director of the United States Park Police in Washington, D.C. From 1938 to 1940, he served in the Philippines, and from 1940 to 1941 he commanded the 9th Infantry Regiment at Fort Bragg, North Carolina.  In 1941, he was assigned as executive officer of the Field Artillery Replacement Center.

World War II
In 1942, Hickey joined the 3rd Armored Division during its World War II training in southern California, assuming command of Combat Command A and receiving promotion to brigadier general.  He assumed command of 3rd Armored Division after the death of Major General Maurice Rose in March 1945, and was promoted to major general.  The 3rd Armored had taken part in combat during the Battle of Hurtgen Forest and the Battle of the Bulge, and after Hickey assumed command the division continued to fight, taking the city of Cologne in March and crossing the Saale River.  On April 11, the 3rd Armored discovered the Dora-Mittelbau concentration camp.

After World War II, the division carried out occupation duty near Langen, and was inactivated in November 1945. Hickey then served as Chief of the Research and Development Division for Headquarters, Army Ground Forces, in Washington, D.C.

Korean War

Hickey served as deputy chief of staff and the de facto chief for the Far East Command in Tokyo during Douglas MacArthur's command.  In 1951, Hickey was officially assigned as chief of staff, receiving promotion to lieutenant general.  He served under MacArthur's successors, Matthew Ridgway and Mark Clark, and played an important role in the planning and execution of operations during the Korean War.

Awards
General Hickey's decorations included two awards of the Distinguished Service Medal, four of the Silver Star, the Legion of Merit and the Bronze Star.

Later career
General Hickey retired from the military in 1953, and became an executive with the Continental Motors Corporation.  In his later years, he resided in Pass Christian, Mississippi.

Death and burial
Hickey died at Ochsner Foundation Hospital in Jefferson, Louisiana on October 20, 1961.  He was buried at Live Oak Cemetery in Pass Christian.

Family
On April 30, 1917, Hickey married Sophronia Purdue Brown of Indianola, Mississippi.  They had no children.

References

Sources

Books

Newspapers

Additional sources
 Normandy to victory: the war diary of General Courtney H. Hodges and the First U.S. Army, William C. Sylvan and John T. Greenwood, edited by John T. Greenwood, 2008, end note 58, page 409
 U.S. Army Register, published by U.S. Army Adjutant General's Office, 1922 page 600
 Newspaper article, Captain Hickey Transferred, Syracuse Herald, April 6, 1932
 Hearing Record, District of Columbia Appropriations, United States House of Representatives Committee on Appropriations, 1933, page 57
 Spearhead in the West, 1941-45: the Third Armored Division, Frank Woolner, Murray H. Fowler, 1945, pages 6 to 8
 Military Affairs: Journal of the American Military Institute, 1945, Volumes 9 to 11, page 36
 A Dark and Bloody ground: the Hurtgen Forest and the Roer River Dams, 1944-1945, Edward G. Miller, 1995, page 214
 US Armored Divisions: the European Theater of Operations, 1944–45, Steven J. Zaloga, 2004, page 78
 Battle of the Ruhr Pocket, Charles Whiting, 1971, page 66
 Newspaper article, General Hickey Named Deputy Chief of Staff, Pacific Stars and Stripes, February 17, 1949
 Newspaper article, General Hickey to Retire After 35 Years in Army, New York Times, March 27, 1953
 The Korean War: a Historical Dictionary, Paul M. Edwards, 2003, page 102
 Encyclopedia of the Korean War: a Political, Social, and Military History, Spencer Tucker, Jinwung Kim, 2000, Volume 3, page 247
 Military Times, Hall of Heroes, Index of Recipients of Major Military Awards, https://web.archive.org/web/20100103174921/http://homeofheroes.com/verify/recipients_he.html
 Newspaper article, Clark Adds Cluster to Hickey's DSM at Farewell Rites, Pacific Stars and Stripes, April 30, 1953
 Skyways for Business, National Business Aircraft Association, 1955, page 5
 Newspaper article, General Hickey, Army Commander: Aide to MacArthur Dies—Led 3d Armored Division, New York Times, October 21, 1961
 Newspaper article, Obituary, D.O. Hickey, Delta (Mississippi) Democrat-Times, October 22, 1961
Generals of World War II

1892 births
1961 deaths
United States Army Field Artillery Branch personnel
United States Army Command and General Staff College alumni
Military personnel from Arkansas
United States Army personnel of World War I
United States Army personnel of the Korean War
Recipients of the Distinguished Service Medal (US Army)
Recipients of the Silver Star
Recipients of the Legion of Merit
People from Rector, Arkansas
Hendrix College alumni
United States Army generals of World War II
United States Army generals